The Second H. D. Kumaraswamy ministry was the Council of Ministers in Karnataka, a state in South India headed by H. D. Kumaraswamy that was formed after the 2018 Karnataka Legislative Assembly elections.

In the government headed by H. D. Kumaraswamy, the Chief Minister was from JD(S) while Deputy Chief Minister was from INC. Apart from the CM & Deputy CM, there were 32 ministers in the government, but all the 32 ministers resigned from their posts in July 2019 due to political turmoil in Karnataka.

Tenure of the Government 
After the 2018 assembly elections, BJP emerged as the single largest party with 104 seats, followed by the INC with 78 seats and JD(S) with 37 seats. INC extended the support to JD(S) to form the government. Governor Vajubhai Vala invited BJP to form the government and B. S. Yeddyurappa was sworn in as the Chief Minister. But B. S. Yeddyurappa could not prove the majority of his government and resigned after 2 days of being sworn in. After that, H. D. Kumaraswamy of the JD(S) was sworn in as the Chief Minister, with the support of INC, BSP, KPJP and IND MLA. INC MLA Dr. G. Parameshwara was sworn in as the Deputy Chief Minister, along with Chief Minister H. D. Kumaraswamy. On 6 June 2018, 25 ministers were inducted in the cabinet.

In July 2019, 13 MLAs from the INC and 3 MLAs from the JD(S) resigned from the assembly, thus pushing the government to a minority. 1 KPJP and 1 IND MLA also withdrew their support from the government and extended their support to BJP. The rebel MLAs left Bangalore and camped in a resort in Mumbai. To pacify the disgruntled MLAs, 32 ministers, excluding the Chief Minister and Deputy Chief Minister, resigned from the ministerial posts. On 18 July, Chief Minister H. D. Kumaraswamy moved the trust vote in the house. Finally on 23 July, after 3 days long debate, the trust vote was put for voting, in which 204 members participated in the voting process. The government lost the majority by getting 99 votes, compared to the 105 votes of the BJP, after which Chief Minister H. D. Kumaraswamy resigned from the post.

Council of Ministers

Former Members
On 8 July 2019, 32 ministers resigned from their posts after the political turmoil in state. But their resignation was not accepted, although the chief minister's office announced that the ministers have resigned.

See also
 Karnataka Legislative Assembly
 2019 Karnataka resignation crisis

References

External links
Council of Ministers

Cabinets established in 2018
2018 establishments in Karnataka
Kumaraswamy 02
Janata Dal (Secular) ministries
2019 disestablishments in India
Cabinets disestablished in 2019
2018 in Indian politics